Wendy Davis Schuler is an American politician and educator, currently serving as a member of the Wyoming Senate from the 15th district, which includes Uinta County.

Early life and education 
Schuler was born Wendy Davis in Evanston, Wyoming. She earned a Bachelor of Science degree in Education from the University of Wyoming.

Career 
Prior to entering politics, Schuler was a teacher in the Uinta County School District Number 1. Schuler defeated incumbent Paul Barnard in the 2018 Republican primary, and took office on January 7, 2019.

References 

Republican Party Wyoming state senators
University of Wyoming alumni
Year of birth missing (living people)
Living people
21st-century American politicians
21st-century American women politicians
Women state legislators in Wyoming